The 1998 Irish Open was a professional ranking snooker tournament, held from 14 to 20 December 1998 at the National Basketball Arena, Dublin, Republic of Ireland, of which only one edition was held. Mark Williams won the tournament by defeating Alan McManus 9–4 in the final.

Prize fund
The breakdown of prize money for this year is shown below: 

Winner: £50,000
Runner-up: £26,000
Semi-final: £13,000
Quarter-final: £7,555
Last 16: £3,750
Last 32: £3,100
Last 48: £1,800

Last 64: £1,250
Last 96: £890
Overseas play-off round: £890
Last 134: £205
Televised highest break: £3,000
Qualifying highest break: £1,000
Total: £305,000

Main draw

Final

Century breaks
 139, 133, 118, 103, 101  Mark Williams
 120  Alan McManus
 118, 102  Bradley Jones
 117  James Wattana
 109, 100  Ken Doherty
 106  Tony Drago
 104  Anthony Hamilton
 104, 100  Stephen Hendry

References

European Masters (snooker)
Irish Open
Open
Irish Open
Snooker competitions in Ireland
Snooker